Baixia was a district of Nanjing, the capital of Jiangsu Province, People's Republic of China. By the side of Qinhuai River, Baixia District has a long history and culture. It is one if the downtown areas of Nanjing and has convenient transportation and economic prosperity. After infrastructure improvement, the area has become an elegant living environment furnishing full communication and functional information network capacity.

Administrative subdivisions
Baixia District administers nine subdistricts.
They are Wulaocun Subdivision, Jiankang Road Subdivision, Hongwu Road Subdivision, Daguang Road Subdivision, Ruijin Road Subdivision, Muxuyuan Subdivision, Guanghua Road Subdivision., Chaotian Palace Subdivision. and Zhimaying Subdivision. The People's Government of Baixia District is located in Hongwu Road Subdivision.

References 
 www.xzqh.org 

County-level divisions of Jiangsu
Districts of Nanjing
1955 establishments in China